The Taipei Metro Taipei Zoo Station is a terminus on Wenhu line, Maokong Gondola Line,  and the planned Circular Line of the Taipei Metro. It is located in the Wenshan District, Taipei, Taiwan.

Station overview
This three-level, elevated station features two side platforms and two exits. It is located on Xinguang Rd., Sec. 2. In order to deal with patronage to the zoo, an underground parking lot was constructed. It connects to the Maokong Gondola and Taipei Zoo.

It will be a transfer station and terminus with Circular Line in 2029, which is expected to bring a lot of convenience to districts in outer Taipei and New Taipei by saving a lot of commuting time. Currently, a trip from Taipei Zoo to Dapinglin requires 40 minutes and two transfers, while a trip from Taipei Zoo to Jingan requires 36 minutes and also two transfers. However, after the opening of phase 2 of the Circular line, a trip to Dapinglin will only take 11 minutes without requiring any transfers, and a trip to Jingan will only take 20 minutes, which also won't require any transfers.

History
It was opened on 28 March 1996. To deal with the increasing patronage, construction began on a second exit in November 2001 before the opening in November 2002. On 20 March 2010; the underground parking lot and bus transfer station opened.

On 4 July 2007, the Maokong Gondola Taipei Zoo Station opened.

Due to structural problems resulting from typhoons, the station was closed along with the gondola system on 1 October 2008; and it officially reopened on 30 March 2010.

Station layout

Around the station
 Taipei Zoo
 Jingmei River
 Daonan Riverside Park
 National Chengchi University

References

Wenhu line stations
Maokong Gondola stations
Railway stations opened in 1996
Station